Matías Ezequiel Vicente Gómez (born 25 June 1995) is an Argentine professional footballer who plays as a defender.

Career
Gómez began his career with Almirante Brown, joining the club in 2005. He made his professional debut on 25 October 2016 during a home victory over Estudiantes in Primera B Metropolitana; Gómez had previously been an unused substitute once during a 2012–13 Primera B Nacional fixture versus Patronato. He made three further appearances for Almirante Brown, prior to departing at the end of the 2016–17 campaign to join fellow third tier side Deportivo Español. After four appearances in two seasons, Gómez was released in June 2019.

Career statistics
.

References

External links

1995 births
Living people
Place of birth missing (living people)
Argentine footballers
Association football defenders
Primera B Metropolitana players
Club Almirante Brown footballers
Deportivo Español footballers